Mary Everest Boole (11 March 1832 in Wickwar, Gloucestershire – 17 May 1916 in Middlesex, England) was a self-taught mathematician who is best known as an author of didactic works on mathematics, such as Philosophy and Fun of Algebra, and as the wife of fellow mathematician George Boole. Her progressive ideas on education, as expounded in The Preparation of the Child for Science, included encouraging children to explore mathematics through playful activities such as curve stitching. Her life is of interest to feminists as an example of how women made careers in an academic system that did not welcome them.

Life
She was born in England, the daughter of Reverend Thomas Roupell Everest, Rector of Wickwar, and Mary nee Ryall. Her uncle was George Everest, the surveyor and geographer after whom Mount Everest was named. She spent the first part of her life in France where she received an education in mathematics from a private tutor. On returning to England at the age of 11, she continued to pursue her interest in mathematics through self-instruction. Self-taught mathematician George Boole tutored her, and she visited him in Ireland where he held the position of professor of mathematics at Queen's College Cork. Upon the death of her father in 1855, they married and she moved to Cork. Mary greatly contributed as an editor to Boole's The Laws of Thought, a work on algebraic logic. She had five daughters by him.

She was widowed in 1864, at the age of 32, and returned to England, where she was offered a post as a librarian at Queen's College, London. She also tutored privately in mathematics and developed a philosophy of teaching that involved the use of natural materials and physical activities to encourage an imaginative conception of the subject. Her interest extended beyond mathematics to Darwinian theory, philosophy and psychology and she organised discussion groups on these subjects among others. At Queen's College, against the approval of the authorities, she organised discussion groups of students with the unconventional James Hinton, a promulgator of polygamy. This in part led to her mental breakdown and the dispersal of her children.

In later life, she belonged to the circle of the Tolstoyan pacifist publisher, C. W. Daniel; she chose the name The Crank for his magazine because, she said, 'a crank was a little thing that made revolutions'.

Mary took an active interest in politics, introducing her daughter Ethel to the Russian anti-tsarist cause under Sergei Stepniak. After the Boer war 1899-1902 she became more outspoken in her writings against imperialism, organised religion, the financial world and the tokenism she felt that Parliament represented. She opposed suffrage and probably for this reason has not generally been regarded as a feminist. She died in 1916, at the age of 84.

Boole was a practitioner of homeopathic medicine.

Contributions to education 
Mary first became interested in mathematics and teaching through her tutor in France, Monsieur Deplace. He helped her understand mathematics through questioning and journal writing. After marrying George Boole she began contributing to the scientific world by advising her husband in his work while attending his lectures, both of which were unheard of for a woman to do in that time period. During this time she also shared ideas with Victoria Welby, another female scholar and dear friend. They discussed everything from logic and mathematics, to pedagogy, theology, and science.

Her teaching first began while working as a librarian. Mary would tutor students with new methods; using natural objects, such as sticks or stones. She theorized that using physical manipulations would strengthen the unconscious understanding of materials learned in a classroom setting. One of her most notable contributions in the area of physical manipulations is curve stitching with the use of sewing cards, which she discovered as a form of amusement as a child. This helped to encourage the connections of mathematical concepts to outside sources.

Her book Philosophy and Fun of Algebra explained algebra and logic to children in interesting ways, starting with a fable, and including bits of history throughout. She references not only history, but also philosophy and literature, using a mystical tone to keep the attention of children.  Mary encouraged the use of mathematical imagination with critical thinking and creativity. This, along with reflective journal writing and creating one's own formulas, was essential in strengthening comprehension and understanding. Cooperative learning was also important because students could share discoveries with each other in an environment of peer tutoring and develop new ideas and methods.

She worked on promoting her husband's works, with great attention to mathematical psychology. George Boole's main focus was on psychologism, and Mary provided a more ideological view of his work. She supported the idea that arithmetic was not purely abstract as many believed, but more anthropomorphic. Pulsation was also important in her works and could be described as a sequence of mental attitudes, with her attention being analysis and synthesis. She believed that Indian logic played a role in the development of modern logic by her husband George Boole and others.

Spiritualism

Boole was interested in parapsychology and the occult, and was a convinced spiritualist. She was the first female member of the Society for Psychical Research which she joined in 1882. However, being the only female member at the time, she resigned after six months.

Boole was the author of the book The Message of Psychic Science for Mothers and Nurses. She revealed the manuscript to Frederick Denison Maurice who objected to its controversial ideas and this resulted in her losing her job as librarian at Queens College. The book was not published until 1883. It was later republished as The Message of Psychic Science to the World (1908).

Family
Her five daughters made their marks in a range of fields. Alicia Boole Stott (1860–1940) became an expert in four-dimensional geometry. Ethel Lilian (1864–1960) married the Polish revolutionary Wilfrid Michael Voynich and was the author of a number of works including The Gadfly. Mary Ellen married mathematician Charles Hinton and Margaret (1858–1935) was the mother of mathematician G. I. Taylor. Lucy Everest (1862–1905) was a talented chemist and became the first woman Fellow of the Institute of Chemistry.

Publications

 
 
 
 
 
  in four volumes

References

Citations

Sources

External links 

 "Mary Everest Boole", Biographies of Women Mathematicians, Agnes Scott College
 
 
 

1832 births
1916 deaths
19th-century English mathematicians
19th-century British philosophers
British women mathematicians
English spiritualists
Parapsychologists
Philosophers of mathematics
People from Wickwar